Eastern Line may refer to:

Railways
Eastern Line (Auckland), a suburban rail service in Auckland, New Zealand
Eastern line (Kolkata Suburban Railway), in West Bengal, India
Eastern Line (Thailand), a railway line in Thailand
Eastern Østfold Line, in Norway
IRT Eastern Parkway Line, a New York City Subway line in Brooklyn, New York, United States
Eastern Suburbs & Illawarra Line, a commuter railway service in Sydney, Australia
Eastern Suburbs railway line, a branch of the Eastern Suburbs & Illawarra Line
Eastern Trunk line, in Taiwan
BMT Canarsie Line, a rapid transit line in Brooklyn, New York, United States, sometimes referred to as the 14th Street–Eastern Line
Chinese Eastern Railway, a railway network centred on Harbin, China
Great Eastern Main Line, in England, United Kingdom, sometimes referred to as the East Anglia Main Line
South Eastern Main Line, in England, United Kingdom

Other
Eastern Steamship Lines, a former shipping company in the United States

See also
East Line (disambiguation)